Meyvalı or Meyvəli may also refer to:

 Meyvalı, Fındıklı 
 Meyvalı, Bigadiç 
 Meyvəli